Antonio de Castro y Casaleiz (Havana, 1856 - Madrid, 1918) was a Spanish politician and diplomat who served, in 1898, as Consul-General of Spain in Cairo.  He also acted briefly as Spanish Foreign Minister in 1903 and 1905.

References
Geneall.net Antonio de Castro y Casaléiz

1856 births
1918 deaths
Deaths from Spanish flu
Ambassadors of Spain to Italy
Ambassadors of Spain to Austria-Hungary